Sudu Kaluwara is a 2003 Sri Lankan Sinhala  film directed by Sudath Rohana and produced by National Film Corporation for NFC Films. It stars Jayalath Manoratne and Sanath Gunathilake, along with Palitha Silva and W. Jayasiri. Music was composed by Navaratne Gamage. The film was filmed around Kalawana area.

This is the first cinema direction by Sudath Rohana, who is a popular teledrama director. It received mainly positive reviews from critics. It is the 1013th Sri Lankan film in the Sinhala cinema. The film has been shot around Kalawewa, Tambuththegama, and Kaltota areas.

A special programme about a preview of Sudu Kaluwara was telecast on Rupavihini on Wednesday, July 31, 2003 at 7.30 pm.

Plot

Cast
 Jayalath Manoratne as Podi Nilame Appuhamy
 Sanath Gunathilake as Seemon Fernando 'Mudalali'
 Geetha Kanthi Jayakody as Lami
 Rathna Lalani Jayakody as Margaret Fernando 'Hamine'
 Indrajith Navinna as Appuhamy 'Appucha'
 Palitha Silva as Dingiri Banda
 Sandeepa Sewmini as Heen Manike
 Buddhadasa Vithanarachchi as Maddu Nilame Appuhamy
 W. Jayasiri as Arachchi
 Lal Kularatne as Heen Manike's father
 Hemasiri Liyanage as Suddhana
 Jayani Senanayake as Heen Manike's mother
 Manohari Wimalathunga as Podi's wife
 Bandula Vithanage as Monk
 Somalatha Subasinghe as Appuhamy's mother
 Damitha Saluwadana as Arachchi's wife
 Sriya Kalubowila as Maddu's wife
 Malkumari Geetharani as Podi's daughter
 Saranapala Jayasuriya as Fired watchman
 Buddhi Wickrama as Registrar
 Wally Nanayakkara as 1st auction viewer

References

2003 films
2000s Sinhala-language films